Jean-Pierre Bolomey (born 10 June 1926) was a Swiss field hockey player. He competed in the men's tournament at the 1952 Summer Olympics.

References

External links
 

1926 births
Possibly living people
Swiss male field hockey players
Olympic field hockey players of Switzerland
Field hockey players at the 1952 Summer Olympics
Place of birth missing (living people)